Olivia Milburn (born 1976) is a sinologist, author and literary translator who specialises in Chinese cultural history and in Chinese minority groups.

Life and career 
Milburn is a professor at the School of Chinese, Hong Kong University.

Milburn grew up in a multilingual family living in eight different countries,
and became interested in Chinese literature as a teenager, after reading a translation of the Dream of the Red Chamber.
She completed a bachelor's degree at St Hilda's College, University of Oxford in 1998, a master's at Downing College, University of Cambridge in 1999, and a doctorate in classical Chinese at the School of Oriental and African Studies, University of London in 2003. After working as a lecturer at the University of London, she joined Seoul National University in 2008 and was appointed as a professor there in 2017. She started her current role at Hong Kong University in April 2022.

Contributions 
Milburn has authored several books including Cherishing Antiquity: The Cultural Construction of an Ancient Chinese Kingdom, Urbanization in Early and Medieval China: Gazetteers for the City of Suzhou, and The Spring and Autumn Annals of Master Yan.

She is also a literary Chinese-to-English translator. Her translations include the bestselling novel Decoded by Mai Jia (co-translated by Christopher Payne), which caught her attention because of a family connection: her grandfather was a codebreaker in World War II, like the book's protagonist. Her translation has been praised for its "tightly wrought aphorisms" and for "the classic beauty and elegant taste of the language".

In 2018, Milburn's translation work was recognised by the Chinese government with a Special Book Award of China, which honours contributions to bridging cultures and fostering understanding.

Selected works 
 The Glory of Yue: An Annotated Translation of the Yuejue shu. Leiden: EJ Brill, 2010. .
 Cherishing Antiquity: The Cultural Construction of an Ancient Chinese Kingdom. Cambridge, Mass.: Harvard University Asia Center, 2013. .
 Urbanization in Early and Medieval China: Gazetteers for the City of Suzhou. Seattle: University of Washington Press, 2015. .
 The Spring and Autumn Annals of Master Yan. Leiden: EJ Brill, 2016. .
The Empress in the Pepper Chamber: Zhao Feiyan in History and Fiction. Seattle: University of Washington Press, 2021. ISBN 978-0295748757.

Selected translations 
 (With Christopher Payne) Mai Jia, Decoded. London: Allan Lane, 2014; and New York: Farrar, Straus and Giroux, 2014. .
 (With Christopher Payne) Mai Jia, In the Dark. London: Penguin, 2015. .
 (With Christopher Payne) Jiang Zilong, Empires of Dust. London: ACA Publishing, 2019. .
Mai Jia, The Message. London: Head of Zeus, 2020. ISBN 978-1789543018.
Feng Jicai, Faces in the Crowd: 36 Extraordinary Tales of Tianjin. London: Sinoist Books, 2020. ISBN 978-1910760482.
Feng Jicai, A Looking-Glass World. London: Sinoist Books, 2021. ISBN 978-1838905149
Feng Menglong, Kingdoms in Peril: A Novel of the Ancient Chinese World at War. Oakland, California: University of California Press, 2022. ISBN 9780520380516.

References 

Sinologists
Chinese–English translators
Literary translators
21st-century translators
Academic staff of Seoul National University
Alumni of Downing College, Cambridge
Alumni of SOAS University of London
Living people
1976 births
Alumni of St Hilda's College, Oxford